Andrew Ward may refer to:
Andrew Ward (author) (born 1946), American writer of historical nonfiction
Andrew Ward (cricketer) (born 1981), English cricketer
Andrew H. Ward (1815–1904), U.S. representative from Kentucky
Andrew J. Ward (1843–1914), Michigan politician
Andy Ward (musician) (born 1952), English drummer with various progressive rock bands
Andy Ward (rugby union) (born 1970), Irish rugby union player